Korean Canadians are Canadian citizens of full or partial Korean ancestry, as well with immigrants from North and South Korea. As of 2016, Korean Canadians are the 8th largest group of Asian Canadians.

Korean immigration to Canada began with seminary students in the 1940s and accelerated during the 1990s. According to the 2021 Canadian Census, there were 218,140 Korean Canadians in Canada. According to South Korea's Ministry of Foreign Affairs and Trade, there were 241,750 ethnic Koreans or people of Korean descent living in Canada , making them the fourth-largest Korean diaspora population (behind Koreans in China, Koreans in the United States, and Koreans in Japan, and ahead of Koreans in Russia, Koreans in Uzbekistan and Koreans in Australia).

History
The first Koreans to live in Canada were local Christians sent by Canadian missionaries as seminary students. Tae-yon Whang is largely regarded as the first recorded Korean immigrant to go to Canada. Tae-yon Whang visited Canada in 1948 as a mission-sponsored medical intern, and stayed in Toronto after his term was over. Unlike Korean Americans who have relatively much longer history settling in the United States, very few settled in Canada; as late as 1965, the total permanent Korean population of Canada was estimated at only 70. However, with the 1966 reform of Canadian immigration laws, South Korean immigration to Canada began to grow. By 1969, there were an estimated 2000 Koreans in Canada. Between 1970 and 1980, 18,148 Koreans immigrated to Canada, and another 17,583 arrived in the following decade. In the late 1990s, South Korea became the fifth-largest source of immigrants to Canada. Toronto has the country's largest absolute number of Koreans, but Vancouver is experiencing the highest rate of growth in its Korean population, with a 69% increase since 1996. Montreal was the third most popular destination for Korean migrants during this period. In 2001, the number of Korean emigrants headed for Canada exceeded the number headed for the United States. The number of temporary residents has also grown ever since the Canadian government granted a visa waiver to South Korea; South Korea was the largest supplier of international students to Canada in the late 1990s. Aside from South Korea, some immigrants are also drawn from among the population of Koreans in China.

The 1990s growth in South Korean migration to Canada occurred at a time when Canadian unemployment was high and income growth was low relative to the United States. One pair of researchers demonstrated that numbers of migrants were correlated with the exchange rate; the weakness of the Canadian dollar relative to the United States dollar meant that South Korean migrants bringing savings to Canada for investment would be relatively richer than those going to the United States. Other factors suggested as drivers behind the growth of South Korean immigration to Canada included domestic anti-Americanism  and the large presence of Canadian English teachers in local hagwon.

According to a 2021 Statistics Canada article, Korean-Canadians have one of the highest poverty rates among all visible minorities hovering between 27% to 32%.

Korean communities
Several Korean communities have developed in Canada since the migration after 1966. The two most concentrated areas are the Koreatown in Toronto and burgeoning Korean communities in Coquitlam and Vancouver.

Toronto

A portion of Seaton Village on Bloor St. from Bathurst St. to Christie St. was designated as Koreatown in 2004. According to the 2001 census Toronto had roughly 43,000 Koreans living in the city, and in 2011 the numbers have grown to 64,755. The Korean community in Toronto has developed Koreatown such that it offers a Korean grocery store, hairdressers, karaoke bars and a multitude of restaurants. The City of Toronto describes Koreatown as "Korea Town is primarily a business district offering a wide range of Korean restaurants, high-end-fashion Korean boutiques, herbalists, acupuncturist and many other unique services and shops which are filled with made-in-Korea merchandise." Koreatown Toronto is also known for its Spring Dano Festival which is run on the 5th day of 5th month of the Korean Lunar Calendar. The festival is run is the Christie Pits area and has been run for the past 21 years with the exception of 2013 when it was cancelled.

Unofficially, the Willowdale/Newtonbrook areas in North York have large numbers of Korean businesses running from Yonge St. between Sheppard Ave. and Steeles Ave. Dubbed Koreatown North, it also has a growing number of Koreans residing in this area. This area first appeared in the 1990s and acceleration in the late 1990s onwards. In the 2000s the  community has expanded into York Region with the area centred along Yonge Street in what is referred to as Thornhill (Vaughan and Markham)

In Coquitlam and Vancouver
Korean communities in both Vancouver and Coquitlam are not officially designated as Koreatown, however their abundant population business districts do represent a developing Korean community. British Columbia and Vancouver represent the second largest Korean community in Canada with 53,770, 49,880 of those living in Vancouver and the surrounding area. The Korean community in Vancouver is located between Nicola and Denman Street and consists of numerous Korean restaurants as well as other businesses. Recently several residents have been promoting the Vancouver Community arguing that it should be called Koreatown and officially designated as such.

In addition to the community in Vancouver proper, the city of Coquitlam also fosters a growing Korean community. As of 2011 the population of Koreans in Coquitlam was approximately 7,900, therefore does not service the same populations as Vancouver or Toronto. However the community at North Road and Lougheed Highway does consist of many Korean fried chicken houses, large grocery stores, and other small salons, most of which have large amounts of Korean signage.

Demographics

2007 figures from the South Korean Ministry of Foreign Affairs and Trade showed 86,084 Canadian citizens, 72,077 permanent residents, 20,738 people on student visas, and 19,271 other temporary residents. The Canada 2001 Census recorded 101,715 Canadians of Korean descent, but Korean community leaders and media organisations suspected that it undercounted the population, especially mobile short-term residents such as English as a Foreign Language students. According to the Canada 1996 Census, 53.6% of Korean immigrants to Canada had attended a four-year tertiary institution, as compared to 23% of the general population. However, because their qualifications and technical certifications are often not recognised by Canadian employers, Korean immigrants often take jobs not commensurate with their education; 40% worked in family-owned businesses, and their average personal income is only 67% that of the average Canadian resident.

Notable individuals

See also

List of Korean Canadians
Koreatown, Toronto
East Asian Canadians
Korean diaspora

Notes

References

External links
Multicultural Canada website includes digitized issues of Minjoong Shinmoon newspaper

 
Ethnic groups in Canada
Asian Canadian
Korean Canadian
Canada
East Asian Canadian